Mission Heights is an eastern suburb of Auckland, New Zealand, comprising Mission Heights North and Mission Heights South. It is located in the wider suburb of Flat Bush.

Demographics 

Mission Heights North 
Mission Heights North had a population of 3,369 at the 2018 New Zealand census. There were 951 households, 1,674 males and 1,695 females, with 23.7% male and 22.8% females aged under 15 years, 20.4% and 17.9% aged 15 – 29 years, 47.7% and 50.4% aged 30 – 64, and 8.2% and 8.8% aged 65 and over.

Ethnicities were 20.2% European/Pākehā, 5.0% Māori, 4.7% Pacific peoples, 72.8% Asian and 1.7% other (totals add to more than 100% since people could identify with multiple ethnicities).

Although some people objected to giving their religion, 36.8% had no religion, 26.7% were Christian, and 36.5% had other religions.

Of those at least 15 years old or above, 24.4% people had a bachelor or higher degree, and 18.2% people had no formal qualifications. The employment status of those at least 15 or above was that 52.4% of people were employed full-time, 12.6% were part-time, and 3.1% were unemployed.

Mission Heights South 
Mission Heights South had a population of 2,805 at the 2018 New Zealand census. There were 792 households, 1,443 males and 1,362 females, with 25.4% male and 22% females aged under 15 years, 21.4% and 22.5% aged 15 – 29 years, 47.6% and 50.4% aged 30 – 64, and 5.4% and 5.3% aged 65 and over.

Ethnicities were 16.0% European/Pākehā, 3.7% Māori, 5.6% Pacific peoples, 76.8% Asian and 4% other (totals add to more than 100% since people could identify with multiple ethnicities).

Although some people objected to giving their religion, 35.2% had no religion, 27.3% were Christian, and 37.4% had other religions.

Of those at least 15 years old or above, 23.7% people had a bachelor or higher degree, and 10.3% people had no formal qualifications. The employment status of those at least 15 or above was that 62.5% of people were employed full-time, 16.7% were part-time, and 3.2% were unemployed.

Education 
Mission Heights Junior College is a junior secondary school (years 7–10) located in the suburb. The school has a decile of 7 and a roll of 871 as of 2022.  Mission Heights School is a contributing primary school (years 1–6) with  students. The two schools are adjacent. Both schools opened in 2009.

References

External Links 

 Mission Heights Junior College website

Suburbs of Auckland
Howick Local Board Area